The Kitty Party Murder is a book written by Kiran Manral. It was published in 2020 by Harper Collins.

Reception
The New Indian Express wrote in a review "Nearly every sentence is packed with jokes and ideas that demand you savour each line for a truly rewarding read."

The Week wrote in a review "It’s a wildly funny, extravagantly inventive, no-punches-pulled, no-expenses-spared tale of a kitty party veteran, viz., Kannan Mehra (Kay, for short) who takes to moonlighting as a private detective for a bit of extra income, and a loads of extra excitement."

The Times of India wrote in a review "Manral delivers her social commentary wound around the murder mystery, bowling readers with her unfazed witticism and flamboyant selection of words."

References

2020 Indian novels
HarperCollins books
Novels set in Mumbai